Tetrix brunnerii, known generally as the brunner pygmy grasshopper or Brunner's grouse locust, is a species of pygmy grasshopper in the family Tetrigidae. It is found in North America.

References

Further reading

 
 

brunnerii
Articles created by Qbugbot
Insects described in 1877